Kieran Strachan (born 5 October 1995) is an Australian rules footballer who plays for the Adelaide Football Club in the Australian Football League (AFL). Strachan was selected with the 7th pick in the 2018 rookie draft.

Early football
Strachan played football for the South Bendigo Football Club. He also played in Essendon's VFL reserves team, before being traded to the Port Melbourne Football Club, where he played 2 games in the 2018 season.

AFL career
Strachan debuted in the Crows' 69 point loss to North Melbourne in the round 9 of the 2020 AFL season. On his debut, Strachan picked up 4 disposals and 4 tackles.

Statistics
 Statistics are correct to the end of 2020

|-
| scope="row" style="text-align:center" | 2019
|  || 45 || 0 || — || — ||  — || — || — || — || — || — || — || — || — || — || — || — || — || —
|- style="background-color: #EAEAEA"
! scope="row" style="text-align:center" | 2020
|style="text-align:center;"|
| 45 || 1 || 0 || 0 || 1 || 3 || 4 || 0 || 4 || 10 || 0.0 || 0.0 || 1.0 || 3.0 || 4.0 || 0.0 || 4.0 || 10.0
|- style="background:#EAEAEA; font-weight:bold; width:2em"
| scope="row" text-align:center class="sortbottom" colspan=3 | Career
| 1
| 0
| 0
| 1
| 3
| 4
| 0
| 4
| 10
| 0.0
| 0.0
| 1.0
| 3.0
| 4.0
| 0.0
| 4.0
| 10.0
|}

Personal life
Strachan is the younger brother of Rebecca Bulley (née Strachan), a former Australia netball international.

References

External links

1995 births
Living people
Adelaide Football Club players
Australian rules footballers from Victoria (Australia)
South Bendigo Football Club players